Leatherstocking Council is the Boy Scouts of America council which serves Herkimer, Oneida and Madison counties as well as part of Hamilton, Otsego, Delaware and Lewis counties in the state of New York.

History
In 2001, the Land of the Oneidas Council and General Herkimer Council merged, forming the Revolutionary Trails Council, which provided Scouting to Herkimer, Oneida and Madison counties as well as part of Hamilton, Otsego and Lewis counties.

In 2016, the Revolutionary Trails Council merged with the Otschodela Council, forming the new Leatherstocking Council. The Leatherstocking Council supports Scouting families across Delaware, Hamilton, Herkimer, Lewis, Oneida, Otsego and Schoharie counties. Its headquarters are located in Utica, NY, at 1401 Genesee Street.

Organization
The current council is divided into three districts:
Powderhorn District
Adirondack District
Susquehanna Headwaters District

Camps

Camp Kingsley

The Leatherstocking Council owns and operates Camp Kingsley in Ava, NY for its summer Cub Scout program and off season camping by Scouts.

Henderson Scout Reservation

Through 2021, Henderson Scout Reservation, in Maryland NY, was the scout summer camp for the Council. In March 2022, the Council announced the camp would be closed and sold. The camp had opened in 1948 when the Otschodela Council BSA moved from a location on Otsego Lake to Crumhorn Mountain. In 2022, the Council announced that it had partnered with Seneca Waterways Council, headquartered in Rochester NY, to have Massawepie Scout Camp, Tupper Lake, NY, be Leatherstocking Council's Scouts BSA summer camp provider.

Camp Russell
Opened in 1918 on White Lake, Woodhall NY, Camp Russell was operated jointly by the General Herkermer Council and the Upper Mohawk Council of Utica NY. In 1939 General Herkimer Council became the sole operator. Frank DiVito served on the camp staff from 1927 to 1999. The camp closed after the 2015 camping season and was sold two years later.

Cedarlands Scout Reservation
The Upper Mohawk Council acquired 5,500 acres in the Adirondack Town of Long Lake in 1964. In 2002, the Council sold to New York State, for $2.3M (USD), an easement for off season recreational use of the property, called the Cedarlands Conservation Easement Tract.Adirondack Daily Enterprise, May 1, 2019 Cedarlands was closed as a Scout summer camp in 2012.  The property was listed for sale in 2015, but due in part to the conservation easement had not yet been sold as of early 2022

Order of the Arrow

The Order of the Arrow  is represented by the Ohkwaliha·Ká Lodge. The lodge supports the camping programs of the Revolutionary Trails Council through camp promotions, camp service weekends and positive leadership.

External links

Leatherstocking Council Web Site

References

Boy Scout councils in New York (state)
2016 establishments in New York (state)
Utica, New York